Eremophila biserrata, also known as prostrate eremophila, is a flowering plant in the figwort family, Scrophulariaceae and is endemic to a small area in the south of Western Australia.

Description
The leaves have serrated edges, the serrations often themselves serrated, sometimes deeply so that the leaf appears to have separate leaflets.

The tube and the petal lobes on its end are green and yellow, sometimes pale red and the 4 stamens extend well beyond the petal tube.

Taxonomy and naming
Eremophila biserrata was first formally described by Robert Chinnock in 1979 and the description was published in Journal of the Adelaide Botanic Garden. The specific epithet (biserrata) refers to the unusually serrated leaf margins.

Distribution and habitat
This eremophila occurs in areas near Hyden and Lake King in the Coolgardie and Mallee biogeographic regions where it grows in sandy and clay soils near salt lakes and freshwater depressions.

Conservation status
Eremophila biserrata is classified as "Priority Four" by the Government of Western Australia Department of Biodiversity, Conservation and Attractions, meaning that it is rare or near threatened.

Use in horticulture
Prostrate eremophila is a ground-hugging shrub, ideal to replace grass where there is no foot traffic, because it does not grow into higher plants. It is easily propagated from cuttings, striking in a few weeks but needs to be kept moist during hot weather when first planted out. It will grow in full sun or as an understorey but is frost tolerant and relatively drought resistant.

References

biserrata
Plants described in 1979
Endemic flora of Western Australia